Eugene Allen Hackman (born January 30, 1930) is an American retired actor and novelist. In a career that spanned more than six decades, Hackman won two Academy Awards, four Golden Globes, one Screen Actors Guild Award, two BAFTAs and one Silver Bear. 

Hackman's two Academy Awards, wins include one for Best Actor for his role as Jimmy "Popeye" Doyle in William Friedkin's acclaimed thriller The French Connection (1971) and the other for Best Supporting Actor playing "Little" Bill Daggett in Clint Eastwood's Western film Unforgiven (1992). His other Oscar-nominated roles were in Bonnie and Clyde (1967), I Never Sang for My Father (1970), and Mississippi Burning (1988).

Hackman's other major film roles included The Poseidon Adventure (1972), The Conversation (1974),  A Bridge Too Far (1977), Superman (1978) and its sequels Superman II (1980) and Superman IV: The Quest for Peace (1987), Hoosiers (1986), No Way Out (1987), Another Woman (1988), Bat*21 (1988), The Firm (1993), The Quick and the Dead (1995), Get Shorty (1995), Crimson Tide (1995), Enemy of the State (1998), Antz (1998), Absolute Power (1997), The Royal Tenenbaums (2001), Runaway Jury (2003) and Welcome to Mooseport (2004).

Early life and education
Eugene Allen Hackman was born on January 30, 1930 in San Bernardino, California, the son of Eugene Ezra Hackman and Anna Lyda Elizabeth (née Gray). He has one brother, Richard. He has Pennsylvania Dutch, English, and Scottish ancestry; his mother was Canadian, and was born in Sarnia, Ontario. His family moved frequently, finally settling in Danville, Illinois, where they lived in the house of his English-born maternal grandmother, Beatrice. Hackman's father operated the printing press for the Commercial-News, a local paper. His parents divorced when he was 13 and his father subsequently left the family. Hackman decided that he wanted to become an actor when he was ten years old.

Hackman lived briefly in Storm Lake, Iowa, and spent his sophomore year at Storm Lake High School. He left home at age 16 and lied about his age to enlist in the United States Marine Corps. He served four and a half years as a field radio operator. He was stationed in China (Qingdao and later in Shanghai). When the Communist Revolution conquered the mainland in 1949, Hackman was assigned to Hawaii and Japan. Following his discharge in 1951, he moved to New York City and had several jobs. His mother died in 1962 as a result of a fire she accidentally started while smoking.  He began a study of journalism and television production at the University of Illinois under the G.I. Bill, but left and moved back to California.

Career

Beginnings to the 1960s
In 1956, Hackman began pursuing an acting career. He joined the Pasadena Playhouse in California, where he befriended another aspiring actor, Dustin Hoffman. Already seen as outsiders by their classmates, Hackman and Hoffman were voted "The Least Likely To Succeed", and Hackman got the lowest score the Pasadena Playhouse had yet given. Determined to prove them wrong, Hackman moved to New York City. A 2004 article in Vanity Fair described Hackman, Hoffman, and Robert Duvall as struggling California-born actors and close friends, sharing NYC apartments in various two-person combinations in the 1960s. To support himself between acting jobs, Hackman was working at a Howard Johnson's restaurant when he encountered an instructor from the Pasadena Playhouse, who said that his job proved that Hackman "wouldn't amount to anything". A Marine officer who saw him as a doorman said "Hackman, you're a sorry son of a bitch". Rejection motivated Hackman, who said,

Hackman got various bit roles, for example on the TV series Route 66 in 1963, and began performing in several Off-Broadway plays. In 1964 he had an offer to co-star in the play Any Wednesday with actress Sandy Dennis. This opened the door to film work. His first role was in Lilith, with Jean Seberg and Warren Beatty in the leading roles. In 1966 he played a small part as Dr. John Whipple in the epic film Hawaii. In 1967 he appeared in an episode of the television series The Invaders entitled "The Spores". Another supporting role, Buck Barrow in 1967's Bonnie and Clyde, earned him an Academy Award nomination as Best Supporting Actor. In 1968 he appeared in an episode of I Spy, in the role of "Hunter", in the episode "Happy Birthday... Everybody". That same year he starred in the CBS Playhouse episode "My Father and My Mother" and the dystopian television film Shadow on the Land. In 1969 he played a ski coach in Downhill Racer and an astronaut in Marooned. Also that year, he played a member of a barnstorming skydiving team that entertained mostly at county fairs, a film which also inspired many to pursue skydiving and has a cult-like status amongst skydivers as a result: The Gypsy Moths. He nearly accepted the role of Mike Brady for the TV series The Brady Bunch, but his agent advised that he decline it in exchange for a more promising role, which he did.

1970s
Hackman was nominated for a second Best Supporting Actor Academy Award for his role in I Never Sang for My Father (1970). The next year, he won the Academy Award for Best Actor for his performance as New York City Detective Jimmy "Popeye" Doyle in The French Connection (1971), marking his graduation to leading-man status.

After The French Connection, Hackman starred in ten films (not including his cameo in Young Frankenstein) over the next three years, making him the most prolific actor in Hollywood during that time frame.  He followed The French Connection with leading roles in the disaster film The Poseidon Adventure (1972) and Francis Ford Coppola's The Conversation (1974), which was nominated for several Oscars, and won the Palme d'Or in Cannes. That same year, Hackman appeared, in what would become one of his most famous comedic roles, as Harold the Blind Man in Young Frankenstein.

He appeared as one of Teddy Roosevelt's former Rough Riders in the Western horse-race saga Bite the Bullet (1975). He reprised his Oscar-winning role as Doyle in the sequel French Connection II (1975), and was part of an all-star cast in the war film A Bridge Too Far (1977), playing Polish General Stanisław Sosabowski. Hackman showed a talent for both comedy and the "slow burn" as criminal mastermind Lex Luthor in Superman: The Movie (1978), a role he would reprise in its 1980 and 1987 sequels.

1980s

Hackman alternated between leading and supporting roles during the 1980s, with prominent roles in Reds (1981)—directed by and starring Warren Beatty—Under Fire (1983), Hoosiers (1986) (which an American Film Institute poll in 2008 voted the fourth-greatest film of all time in the sports genre), No Way Out (1987) and Mississippi Burning (1988), where he was nominated for a second Best Actor Oscar. Between 1985 and 1988, he starred in nine films, making him the busiest actor, alongside Steve Guttenberg.

1990s
Hackman appeared with Anne Archer in Narrow Margin (1990), a remake of the 1952 film The Narrow Margin. In 1992, he played the sadistic sheriff "Little" Bill Daggett in the Western Unforgiven directed by Clint Eastwood and written by David Webb Peoples. Hackman had pledged to avoid violent roles, but Eastwood convinced him to take the part, which earned him a second Oscar, this time for Best Supporting Actor. The film also won Best Picture.

In 1993, he appeared in Geronimo: An American Legend as Brigadier General George Crook, and co-starred with Tom Cruise as a corrupt lawyer in The Firm, a legal thriller based on the John Grisham novel of the same name. Hackman would appear in two other films based on John Grisham novels, playing convict Sam Cayhall on death row in The Chamber (1996), and jury consultant Rankin Fitch in Runaway Jury (2003).

Other notable films Hackman appeared in during the 1990s include Wyatt Earp (1994) (as Nicholas Porter Earp, Wyatt Earp's father), The Quick and the Dead (1995) opposite Sharon Stone, Leonardo DiCaprio and Russell Crowe, and as submarine Captain Frank Ramsey alongside Denzel Washington in Crimson Tide (1995). Hackman played film director Harry Zimm with John Travolta in the comedy-drama Get Shorty (1995). He reunited with Clint Eastwood in Absolute Power (1997), and co-starred with Will Smith in Enemy of the State (1998), his character reminiscent of the one he had portrayed in The Conversation.

In 1996, he took a comedic turn as conservative Senator Kevin Keeley in The Birdcage with Robin Williams and Nathan Lane.

2000s
Hackman co-starred with Owen Wilson in Behind Enemy Lines (2001), and appeared in the David Mamet crime thriller Heist (2001), as an aging professional thief of considerable skill who is forced into one final job. He also gained much critical acclaim playing against type as the head of an eccentric family in Wes Anderson's comedy film The Royal Tenenbaums (2001), for which he received the Golden Globe Award for Best Actor in a Motion Picture Musical or Comedy. In 2003, he also starred in another John Grisham legal drama, Runaway Jury, at long last getting to make a picture with his long-time friend Dustin Hoffman. In 2004, Hackman appeared alongside Ray Romano in the comedy Welcome to Mooseport, his final film acting role to date.

Hackman was honored with the Cecil B. DeMille Award from the Golden Globe Awards for his "outstanding contribution to the entertainment field" in 2003.

Retirement from acting
On July 7, 2004, Hackman gave a rare interview to Larry King, where he announced that he had no future film projects lined up and believed his acting career was over. In 2008, while promoting his third novel, he confirmed that he had retired from acting. When asked during a GQ interview in 2011 if he would ever come out of retirement to do one more film, he said he might consider it "if I could do it in my own house, maybe, without them disturbing anything and just one or two people." He briefly came out of retirement to narrate two documentaries related to the Marine Corps: The Unknown Flag Raiser of Iwo Jima (2016) and We, The Marines (2017).

Career as a novelist

Together with undersea archaeologist Daniel Lenihan, Hackman has written three historical fiction novels: Wake of the Perdido Star (1999), a sea adventure of the 19th century; Justice for None (2004), a Depression-era tale of murder; and Escape from Andersonville (2008) about a prison escape during the American Civil War. His first solo effort, a story of love and revenge set in the Old West titled Payback at Morning Peak, was released in 2011. His most recent novel Pursuit, a police thriller, followed in 2013.

In 2011, Hackman appeared on the Fox Sports Radio show The Loose Cannons, where he discussed his career and his novels with Pat O'Brien, Steve Hartman, and Vic "The Brick" Jacobs.

Personal life

Marriages and family 
Hackman has been married twice. He has three children from his first marriage.

In 1956, Hackman married Faye Maltese (1929–2017), with whom he had one son and two daughters: Christopher Allen, Elizabeth Jean, and Leslie Anne Hackman. He was often out on location making films while the children were growing up. The couple divorced in 1986, after three decades of marriage.

In 1991, he married classical pianist Betsy Arakawa (born 1961). They share a Santa Fe, New Mexico home, which Architectural Digest featured in 1990. At the time, the home blended Southwestern styles and crested a twelve acre hilltop, with a 360-degree view that stretched to the Colorado mountains. , Hackman continues to attend Santa Fe cultural events.

Politics 
Hackman is a supporter of the Democratic Party, and was "proud" to be included on Nixon's Enemies List. However, he has spoken fondly of Republican president Ronald Reagan.

Interests 
In the late 1970s, Hackman competed in Sports Car Club of America races, driving an open-wheeled Formula Ford. In 1983, he drove a Dan Gurney Team Toyota in the 24 Hours of Daytona Endurance Race. He also won the Long Beach Grand Prix Celebrity Race.

Hackman is a fan of the Jacksonville Jaguars and regularly attended Jaguars games as a guest of former head coach Jack Del Rio. Their friendship goes back to Del Rio's playing days at the University of Southern California.

Architecture and design are another of Hackman's interests. As of 1990, he had created ten homes, two of which were featured in Architectural Digest. After a period of time, he moves onto another house restoration. "I don't know what's wrong with me," he remarked, "I guess I like the process, and when it's over, it's over."

In 2012, 81-year-old Hackman was struck by a pickup truck while bicycling in the Florida Keys. He made a full recovery. As of 2018, Hackman remains an active cyclist.

Health 
Hackman underwent an angioplasty in 1990.

Filmography

Film

Television

Theatre

Accolades

Asteroid 55397 Hackman, discovered by Roy Tucker in 2001, was named in his honor. The official  was published by the Minor Planet Center on May 18, 2019.

Works or publications
 Hackman, Gene, and Daniel Lenihan. Wake of the Perdido Star. New York: Newmarket Press, 1999. .
 Hackman, Gene, and Daniel Lenihan. Justice for None. New York: St. Martins Press, 2004. .
 Hackman, Gene, and Daniel Lenihan. Escape from Andersonville: A Novel of the Civil War. New York: St. Martin's Press, 2008. .
 Hackman, Gene. Payback at Morning Peak: A Novel of the American West. New York: Simon & Schuster Inc, 2011. .
 Hackman, Gene. Pursuit. New York: Pocket Books, 2013. .

References

External links

 
 
 
 
 

|-

1930 births
20th-century American male actors
20th-century American novelists
21st-century American male actors
21st-century American novelists
Male actors from California
American male film actors
American male voice actors
American male novelists
American male stage actors
American people of Canadian descent
American people of English descent
American people of Pennsylvania Dutch descent
American people of German descent
American people of Scottish descent
Art Students League of New York alumni
Best Actor Academy Award winners
Best Actor BAFTA Award winners
Best Drama Actor Golden Globe (film) winners
Best Musical or Comedy Actor Golden Globe (film) winners
Best Supporting Actor Academy Award winners
Best Supporting Actor BAFTA Award winners
Best Supporting Actor Golden Globe (film) winners
Cecil B. DeMille Award Golden Globe winners
Living people
Male Western (genre) film actors
Outstanding Performance by a Cast in a Motion Picture Screen Actors Guild Award winners
People from Danville, Illinois
Actors from San Bernardino, California
Male actors from Santa Fe, New Mexico
People from Storm Lake, Iowa
Military personnel from Iowa
Silver Bear for Best Actor winners
Writers from Santa Fe, New Mexico
United States Marines
University of Illinois Urbana-Champaign College of Media alumni
20th-century American male writers
21st-century American male writers
Novelists from California
Novelists from New York (state)
California Democrats
New Mexico Democrats